Tasmania's offshore islands: seabirds and other natural features is a book published by the Tasmanian Museum and Art Gallery in 2001. The book is considered an essential measure of the state of Tasmania's islands, birds inhabiting them, and the condition of the islands. The main author was Nigel Brothers, a Hobart based biologist, the other contributors were Vanessa Halley, Helen Pryor,  and David Pemberton.

Coastal/Island groupings
Brothers, et al., choose to group the coastal regions and their associated islands in seven broad coastal regions:
 North west islands
 North coast islands
 North Bass Strait islands
 Furneaux islands
 North east islands
 East coast islands
 South and west coast islands

References

External links
 Tasmania's Offshore Islands: Seabirds and Other Natural Features. Tasmanian Museum and Art Gallery online bookshop entry.

Islands of Tasmania
Australian non-fiction books
Books about Tasmania
Coastline of Tasmania
2001 non-fiction books